Philip Harper (born May 10, 1965) is an American jazz trumpeter.

Early life 
Born in Baltimore, Maryland, Harper grew up in Atlanta. He studied under Jackie McLean at the University of Hartford Hartt School.

Career 
Harper played with the Jazz Messengers and Mingus Big Band. He also signed with Verve Records and produced four albums for them.

From 1988 to 1993, Harper played in the Harper Brothers with his brother, Winard. Other band members included Justin Robinson on alto saxophone, Stephen Scott on piano and Michael Bowie on bass.

Discography
 1988 Harper Brothers (Verve)
 1989 Remembrance: Live at the Village Vanguard (Verve)
 1991 Artistry  (Verve)
 1992 You Can Hide Inside the Music  (Verve)
 1993 Soulful Sin (Muse) 
 1994 The Thirteenth Moon (Muse)
With Cecil Brooks III
Hangin' with Smooth (Muse, 1990)
With Etta Jones
Reverse the Charges (Muse, 1992)
With Houston Person
Why Not! (Muse, 1991)
The Lion and His Pride (Muse, 1991 [1994])

References 

1965 births
Living people
Musicians from Baltimore
Hard bop trumpeters
American jazz trumpeters
American male trumpeters
The Jazz Messengers members
American male jazz musicians
University of Hartford Hartt School alumni